Mykyta Kryukov (born 30 April 1991 in Donetsk, Donetsk Oblast, Ukrainian SSR) is a Ukrainian football goalkeeper who plays for Rubin Yalta.

Career
Kryukov played one match for Ukrainian national youth football squad. He was called up as member of the Ukraine national under-21 football team by coach Pavlo Yakovenko in March 2011, and played one game.

Made his debut for FC Illichivets in the game against FC Shakhtar Donetsk on 5 April 2015 in the Ukrainian Premier League.

References

External links 

Ukrainian footballers
Sportspeople from Donetsk
FC Shakhtar-3 Donetsk players
FC Mariupol players
Ukrainian Premier League players
Association football goalkeepers
1991 births
Living people
FC Hirnyk-Sport Horishni Plavni players
FC Krystal Kherson players
MFC Mykolaiv players